The Harris Gunworks M-96 is a semi automatic sniper rifle. Manufactured by Harris Gunworks at Phoenix, Arizona, this is chambered for .50 BMG currently used heavily by the United States Armed Forces and Malaysian Armed Forces.

References

External links 
 Harris Gunworks

.50 BMG sniper rifles
Semi-automatic rifles of the United States
Short stroke piston firearms
Sniper rifles of the United States